Kyle Hamilton may refer to:
Kyle Hamilton (American football) (born 2001), American football player
Kyle Hamilton (rower) (born 1978), Canadian rower